Campoa is a genus of fungi in the family Parmulariaceae.

References

External links 

 Campoa at Index Fungorum

Parmulariaceae